Dimorphosciadium is a genus of flowering plants belonging to the family Apiaceae.

Its native range is Central Asia to Xinjiang.

Species:

Dimorphosciadium gayoides 
Dimorphosciadium shenii

References

Apiaceae
Apiaceae genera